Yekaterinovka is a rural locality in Vyshnederevensky Selsoviet Rural Settlement, Lgovsky District, Kursk Oblast, Russia. Population:

Geography 
The village is located in the Apoka River basin (a left tributary of the Seym), 38 km from the Russia–Ukraine border, 73 km south-west of Kursk, 11 km south-west of the district center – the town Lgov, 9 km from the selsoviet center – Vyshniye Derevenki.

 Climate
Yekaterinovka has a warm-summer humid continental climate (Dfb in the Köppen climate classification).

Transport 
Yekaterinovka is located 7.5 km from the road of regional importance  (Kursk – Lgov – Rylsk – border with Ukraine), 6.5 km from the road  (Lgov – Sudzha), 3.5 km from the road of intermunicipal significance  (38K-024 – Maleyevka – Lyubomirovka), 3.5 km from the nearest railway halt Kolontayevka (railway line 322 km – Lgov I).

The rural locality is situated 79.5 km from Kursk Vostochny Airport, 142 km from Belgorod International Airport and 282 km from Voronezh Peter the Great Airport.

References

Notes

Sources

Rural localities in Lgovsky District